Benipur is a census town in Varanasi tehsil of  Varanasi district in the Indian state of Uttar Pradesh. The census town falls under  the Benipur gram panchayat.  Benipur Census town is about 7 kilometers North-East of Varanasi railway station, 303 kilometers South-East of  Lucknow and 14 kilometers North of Banaras Hindu University.

Demography
Benipur has 1,708 families with a total population of 12,470. Sex ratio of the census town is 908 and child sex ratio is 848. Uttar Pradesh state average for both ratios is 912 and 902 respectively  .

Transportation
Benipur  is connected by air (Lal Bahadur Shastri Airport), by train (Varanasi City railway station) and by road. Nearest operational airports is Lal Bahadur Shastri Airport and nearest operational railway station is  Varanasi City railway station (24 and 5 kilometers respectively from  Benipur).

See also

 Varanasi district
 Varanasi (Lok Sabha constituency)
 Varanasi North
 Varanasi tehsil

Notes

  All  demographic data is based on 2011 Census of India.

References 

Census towns in Varanasi district
Cities and towns in Varanasi district